This article lists political parties in Montenegro.

Montenegro has a multi-party system with numerous political parties, in which no one party often has a chance of gaining power alone, and parties must work with each other to form coalition governments.

Active parties

Parliamentary parties

Parties without seats

Historical and defunct parties

See also
Politics of Montenegro
Parliament of Montenegro
List of political parties by country
Elections in Montenegro

References

Montenegro
 
Political parties
Political parties
Montenegro